Clifton Bailey Beach (September 16, 1845 – November 15, 1902) was an American lawyer and politician who served two terms as a U.S. Representative from Ohio from 1895 to 1899.

Biography 
Born in Sharon Township, Medina County, Ohio, Beach moved to Cleveland with his parents in 1857.
He attended the common schools and was graduated from Western Reserve College in Hudson, Ohio, known now as Case Western Reserve University, in 1871.
He studied law.
He was admitted to the bar in 1872 and commenced practice in Cleveland.
He served as deputy collector of customs at Cleveland.
He retired from the practice of law in 1884 and engaged in the manufacture of wire nails, staples, and rods.

Beach was elected as a Republican to the Fifty-fourth and Fifty-fifth Congresses (March 4, 1895 – March 3, 1899).
He was not a candidate for renomination in 1898.
He resumed his former manufacturing pursuits in Cleveland.
He died at Rocky River, Ohio, November 15, 1902.
He was interred in Lake View Cemetery, Cleveland, Ohio.

Sources

1845 births
1902 deaths
Politicians from Cleveland
Burials at Lake View Cemetery, Cleveland
Case Western Reserve University alumni
Ohio lawyers
19th-century American politicians
Lawyers from Cleveland
Republican Party members of the United States House of Representatives from Ohio